Szilvia Péter Szabó (born 9 September 1982, Szeged, Hungary) is Hungarian pop singer. She is most well known as the singer of the Hungarian folk-pop band NOX.

Career
She learned to sing on her own. Early in her career, she was a singer of a small band in Szeged. Later, she was discovered and was chosen to become the singer of the newly created music group NOX. She has been a member of the group ever since unlike nearly all other members.

NOX has been very successful. They took part in the Eurovision Song Contest, they won the Dalnokok Ligája and they also won several awards. NOX is one of the most well-known groups in Hungary and they plan to tour Western Europe.

In 2012, Szabó signed a new management deal with the UK music artist management firm Crossfire Management (http://www.crossfiremanagement.com), managed by Roy Perestrelo and Pierre Lewis and in the same year signed a new deal with Universal Music Group and Universal Hungary to see her create her 11th Studio album entitled "REVOLUTION" which has works produced by herself, Joe Lawrence, Pierre Lewis (http://www.pierreofficial.com), MAC-1 (http://www.mac1official.com) (Labyrinths elder brother), Perri Hawn, Nu:GEN (http://www.nugenmusic.co.uk) Sam Barter and Paul Britt (http://www.paulbritt.com)

Personal life
Szabó travels extensively and spends her time between her home in the UK and Hungary. Her touring extends over Eastern Europe and beyond.

Discography

Albums
All information given are for Hungary only.

See also
Hungarian pop

External links

 
 Official website
 Management website
 NOX fansite
 NOX fansite

1982 births
Living people
21st-century Hungarian women singers